OpenTK, also known as The Open Toolkit library, is a C# graphics library superseding the Tao Framework. It provides access to graphics tools contained in OpenGL, OpenCL, and OpenAL to a variety of CLR-based languages (C#, F#, etc.). Particularly, it is usable with any language utilizing either of the .NET Framework or Mono frameworks for versions prior to 4.0 and .NET Core 3.1 and up, continuing with .NET 5, for major version 4.

References

External links
 
 
 

Free 3D graphics software
Mono (software)